The Republic of North Ingria, Ingrian: Pohja-inkeriläin respublikka) or Republic of Kirjasalo (Ingrian: Kirjsalon respublikka) was a short-lived, small state for the Ingrian Finns in the southern part of the Karelian Isthmus, which seceded from Bolshevist Russia after the October Revolution. Its aim by most proponents was to ultimately be incorporated into the Kingdom of Finland, and it ruled parts of Northern Ingria from 1919 until 1920. With the Peace Treaty of Tartu, it was re-integrated into Russia; however, Ingrian Finns of this area enjoyed a certain degree of national autonomy until the 1930s in compliance with the policy of national delimitation in the Soviet Union. In 1928 the Kuivaisi National District was established there with its administrative base in Toksovo. In 1939 it was abolished and the area was joined to the Pargolovo district. Today, it is the north-eastern part of Vsevolozhsky District.

See also 
Postage stamps and postal history of North Ingria
Revolt of the Ingrian Finns
Ingrian Finns

References

External links 
Ingria on Fire: A little-known episode of the White Movement , including a map of Finnish toponyms.

1920 disestablishments in Russia
Ingria
Post–Russian Empire states
History of the Karelian Isthmus
States and territories established in 1919
Finland–Russia relations
Finland–Soviet Union relations
Political history of Finland
Separatism in Russia